In organic chemistry, dimethoxybenzene is an organic compound which is derived from benzene by substituting two methoxy groups. Dimethoxybenzene comes in three structural isomers:

1,2-Dimethoxybenzene (Veratrole)
1,3-Dimethoxybenzene
1,4-Dimethoxybenzene

All isomers share the molecular weight 138.17 g/mol and the chemical formula .